Sala Baganza is a comune (municipality) in the Province of Parma in the Italian region Emilia-Romagna, located about  northwest of Bologna and about  southwest of Parma.

Sala Baganza borders the following municipalities: Calestano, Collecchio, Felino, Fornovo di Taro, Parma, Terenzo.

Some 5 km from town, on the road to Collecchio, is the Pieve di Talignano, a small 12th-century church in Romanesque style. Other sights include:
Rocca Sanvitale: Former castle/palace of the Sanvitale family, used later by the Duchal rulers of Parma as a hunting lodge and country palace
Casino dei Boschi, a large 18th-century countryside residence that, among the others, was used by Marie Louise, Duchess of Parma
Castello di San Vitale Baganza - in a hamlet south of Sala Baganza
San Vitale: 10th century church near the Castello di San Vitale mentioned above
Santi Stefano e Lorenzo: Church built 1582-1586, also by the Sanvitale.

References

External links
 Official website

Cities and towns in Emilia-Romagna